The Canadian Journal of Respiratory Therapy (French: Revue canadienne de la thérapie respiratoire) is a quarterly peer-reviewed medical journal covering research on respiratory therapy and pulmonology. It was published on behalf of the Canadian Society of Respiratory Therapists by the Pulsus Group, until this company was acquired by the OMICS Publishing Group in 2016. This led the society to cancel their publishing agreement with Pulsus, switching instead to Canadian Science Publishing. No issues were produced with OMICS. The editor-in-chief is Elizabeth Rohrs (Royal Columbian Hospital).

References

External links
 

Pulmonology journals
Publications established in 1996
Multilingual journals
Quarterly journals
Academic journals associated with learned and professional societies of Canada